Yagba East is a Local Government Area in Kogi State, Nigeria. Its headquarters is in the town of Isanlu on the A123 highway, and is populated mainly by the Okun people.
 
It had an area of 1,396 km and a population of 140,150 during the 2006 census.  By 2016, the population grew to 199,300.

The postal code of the area is 262.

Notable People 
Pius Adesanmi
Grace Oyelude
HRH Oba Moses Babatunde Etombi
Karim Sunday Steve
Jimoh Musa
Leke Abejide
Jide Omokore

Town and Villages in Yagba East
Iddo
Idofin
Ijowa
Ilafin
Irunda
Isanlu-Itedo
Isanlu-Makutu
Isanlu-Mopo
Iye
Lofin
Odogbe
Agi
Aginmi-Isale
Aginmi-Oke
Aiyede
Aiyegunde-Oke
Aiyegunle-Okeagi
Alu
Ejuku
Ife-Olukotun
Igbagun
Igbo-Ero
Ilai
Imela
Isao
Jege
Odo-Amu
Ogbom
Ohun
Okeagi
Oranre
Ponyan
Takete- Isao

References

Local Government Areas in Kogi State
Local Government Areas in Yorubaland